Helenus of Alexandria Scabiosa in Cilicia was bishop of Alexandria Scabiosa (modern İskenderun, Turkey) in the 2nd or 3rd century.

According to Le Quien, he baptized the martyr Eugenia of Rome under the reign of Commodus. He was canonized as a saint. But other sources claim it was Helenus of Heliopolis or Helenus of Tarsus.

Notes

References
 Sir William Smith, Henry Wace, A Dictionary of Christian Biography, Literature, Sects and Doctrines: Being a Continuation of "The Dictionary of the Bible, 2:886 full text

Saints from Roman Anatolia
2nd-century bishops in Roman Anatolia
3rd-century bishops in Roman Anatolia